The wobble board is a musical instrument invented and popularized by the Australian musician and artist Rolf Harris, and is featured in his best-known song "Tie Me Kangaroo Down, Sport". A wobble board, like some other musical instruments, can be ornately decorated because its large surface area can act as a canvas without detracting from its musical capability.

The instrument is played by holding the board lengthwise with the hands holding the edges and flicking the board outward, thereby making a characteristic "whoop-whoop" noise. The angle at which the board is held, and the way the board is "flicked", can alter the timbre of the sound produced. It is similar to the boards used to imitate the sound of thunder in the theatre of Shakespeare's time.

History

Official Rolf Harris wobble boards were sold commercially for a time in the 1970s but most are made by the player. Almost any large, springy and flexible sheet of material can be used as an impromptu wobble board, although some materials are markedly better than others. Harris's instrument was originally made from a type of wood composite known as hardboard (Masonite in the United States and Australia). According to an interview he gave to Tony Barrell for The Sunday Times Magazine in 2001, Harris discovered the musical properties of hardboard by chance in 1959, when he was about to paint a portrait of the conjurer Robert Harbin. Before his subject arrived, Harris prepared the background, covering a large piece of hardboard with Prussian blue oil paint mixed with turpentine. But the surface refused to dry. "It was all sticky and nasty. He was due to arrive in about half an hour." In desperation, Harris propped the board over a paraffin heater. When he touched it later, it was so hot it burned his finger. "So I propped it between the palms of my hands and shook it to cool it down. And ... I thought, 'What a marvellous sound.'"

Rolf Harris said:

Two wobble boards donated by Harris were part of the National Museum of Australia collection before they were removed in the light of his arrest for indecent assault in 2013.

References

Lamellophones
Australian inventions
Australian musical instruments
Rolf Harris